Quins may refer to:

Quins is the nickname of two rugby teams who play under the name Harlequins and play their home games at the Twickenham Stoop:
Harlequins RL, a rugby league team
Harlequin F.C., a rugby union team

It may also refer to:
Quintuplet quins is short for quintuplets meaning 5 in number as in multiple birth
Quintuplets is a sitcom that aired twenty-two episodes on FOX from June 16, 2004, through January 12, 2005
Quintuplets 2000 is episode 52 in the fourth season of the Comedy Central series South Park

Places
Quins, Aveyron, a commune of France in the Aveyron department

See also
Quinns (disambiguation)